Alexander Kukarin (13 August 1993 – 27 November 2015) was a Russian modern pentathlete. He was considered an up-and-coming athlete who had begun to represent the Russian national team in 2015. He won the silver medal at the 2015 World Modern Pentathlon Championships in the men's relay together with Kirill Belyakov in June 2015 and the bronze medal at the 2015 European championship in the mixed relay and he won the 2015 Cup of Russia. In the cadet category in 2011 he became double world champion at the UIPM Youth A world championships in his own headship and in the men's relay.

On 27 November 2015, when he was 22 years old, he was found dead in a hotel room in Moscow after a suspected heart attack. An investigation is under way but there are no signs of foul play.

Palmares

Cadet 
  2011 UIPM youth A world championships (headship)
  2011 UIPM youth A world championships (relay)

Senior 
  2015 World Modern Pentathlon Championships (relay, with Kirill Belyakov)
  2015 European Modern Pentathlon Championships (mixed relay)
 1st Cup of Russia

References

External links
 

Russian male modern pentathletes
2015 deaths
Place of birth missing
1993 births
Sportspeople from Moscow
World Modern Pentathlon Championships medalists